Lokomotiv Stadium is a multi-use stadium in Chita, Russia. It is used mostly for football matches. The stadium holds 12,500 people.

References 
 https://www.footballgroundmap.com/ground/stadion-lokomotiv-chita/chita

Sports venues built in the Soviet Union
Football venues in Russia